The 1913 East Waterford by-election was held on 15 February 1913.  The by-election was held due to the death of the incumbent Irish Parliamentary MP, Patrick Joseph Power.  It was won by the Irish Parliamentary candidate Martin Joseph Murphy, who was unopposed.

References

1913 elections in Ireland
1913 elections in the United Kingdom
By-elections to the Parliament of the United Kingdom in County Waterford constituencies
Unopposed by-elections to the Parliament of the United Kingdom (need citation)